Toivo Armas Hyytiäinen (12 November 1925 in Saarijärvi – 21 October 1978) was a Finnish athlete who competed mainly in the men's javelin throw during his career.

He competed for Finland at the 1952 Summer Olympics held in Helsinki, Finland where he won the bronze medal in the men's javelin throw competition.

1925 births
1978 deaths
People from Saarijärvi
Finnish male javelin throwers
Olympic bronze medalists for Finland
Athletes (track and field) at the 1952 Summer Olympics
Olympic athletes of Finland
European Athletics Championships medalists
Medalists at the 1952 Summer Olympics
Olympic bronze medalists in athletics (track and field)
Sportspeople from Central Finland